Alisa Kleybanova was the defending champion but was unable to compete due to Hodgkin Lymphoma. María José Martínez Sánchez defeated Galina Voskoboeva, 7–6(7–0), 7–6(7–2), in the final for her first hardcourt title.

Seeds

Qualifying

Main draw

Finals

Top half

Bottom half

References

External links
 Main draw and Qualifying draw

Korea Open (tennis)
Korea Open - Singles